Tuve-Säve is a parish of the Diocese of Gothenburg, in Gothenburg, Sweden. It was formed in 2010 by the merger of the Tuve and Säve parishes. Since 2018 it has been in a common pastorate with the parish of Backa. Tuve Church is part of the parish.

References

Diocese of Gothenburg
Church parishes in Europe